Arlington Independent School District or AISD is a school district based in Arlington, Texas (USA).

The Arlington Independent School District covers the majority of Arlington and much of the Tarrant County portion of Grand Prairie. The district serves the entirety of the small towns of Pantego and Dalworthington Gardens. A portion of Fort Worth, Dallas and Mansfield lies within the district; it only contains a wastewater plant. No Fort Worth residents are zoned to Arlington ISD schools.

Governance
The Arlington Independent School District is governed by a publicly elected school board. The current members of the board for the 2014-2015 school year are:

 Ms. Melody Fowler - President
 Mr. Justin Chapa - Vice President
 Ms. Sarah McMurrough - Secretary
 Dr. Aaron Reich - Board Member
 Mr. David Wilbanks - Board Member
 Mr. John Hibbs - Board Member
 Ms. Kecia Mays - Board Member

In December 2012, Dr. Marcelo Cavazos was named superintendent of Arlington Independent School District after serving as the interim superintendent for six months.

History
Arlington High School was the district's sole white high school until Sam Houston High School opened in 1963. The district desegregated in 1965. Lamar High School, the third high school, opened in 1970. Bowie High School served as the district's fourth high school, opening in 1973.

Finances
As of the 2010-2011 school year, the appraised valuation of property in the district was $18,762,592,000. The maintenance tax rate was $0.104 and the bond tax rate was $0.030 per $100 of appraised valuation.

Academic achievement
In 2011, the school district was rated "academically acceptable" by the Texas Education Agency.  Forty-nine percent of districts in Texas in 2011 received the same rating. No state accountability ratings will be given to districts in 2012. A school district in Texas can receive one of four possible rankings from the Texas Education Agency: Exemplary (the highest possible ranking), Recognized, Academically Acceptable, and Academically Unacceptable (the lowest possible ranking).

Historical district TEA accountability ratings
2011: Academically Acceptable
2010: Recognized
2009: Academically Acceptable
2008: Academically Acceptable
2007: Academically Acceptable
2006: Academically Acceptable
2005: Academically Acceptable
2004: Academically Acceptable

In 1997, at all high schools except one, the percentage of students passing each section of the Texas Assessment of Knowledge and Skills (TAKS) increased. At Lamar the percentage of students passing the reading portion had decreased.

Students 
The AISD enrolls nearly 60,000 students making it the 11th largest school district in Texas. It has an annual budget of $508,353,783 and spends $7,937 per year per student.

Demographics 
As of March 2023, its student population is made up of the following ethnicities:

47.1% Hispanic

25.8% Black

17.9% White

5.8% Asian

2.8% Multiracial

Schools 
As of the 2014-2015 school year, the Arlington Independent School District has a total of 76 schools, 10 high schools, 13 junior high schools and 53 elementary schools. The previous information includes alternative schools.

High Schools (Grades 9-12) 

Arlington High School
James Bowie High School
Sam Houston High School
Lamar High School
James W. Martin High School
Juan Seguin High School

Alternative High Schools
 Arlington Collegiate High School at TCC-SE 
 Newcomer Center 
 Turning Point Junior High School 
 Turning Point High School 
 Venture School

Junior High Schools (Grades 7-8) 

Joe Bailey Junior High School 

Bailey Junior high is located at 2411 Winewood St, Arlington, Texas. The school had 834 students enrolled in the 2010-2011 school year. Its school colors are red and white and its mascot is a ram.  The student newspaper is called The Ram Page, and the yearbook is called Wild About Rams. The current principal is Tiffany Benavides.
Christine Barnett Junior High School 
Truett C. Boles Junior High School 
James I. Carter Junior High School 
J.C. Ferguson Junior High School (Now Closed, Building now houses Newcomer Center and Venture HS) 
Floyd M. Gunn Junior High School 
Guy C. Hutcheson Junior High School (Now Closed, Demolished) 
Dora E. Nichols Junior High School 
Emma Ousley Junior High School 
O.D. Shackelford Junior High School 
Mayfield Workman Junior High School 
Charles Young Junior High School

Alternative Jr. High Schools 
Turning Point Jr. High School

Elementary schools (Grades PK-6) 

Adams Elementary School
Amos Elementary School
Anderson Elementary School
Ashworth Elementary School
Atherton Elementary School
Bebensee Elementary School
Beckham Elementary School
Berry Elementary School
Blanton Elementary School
Bryant Elementary School
Burgin Elementary School
Butler Elementary School
Corey Elementary School
Crouch Elementary School
Crow Elementary School
Ditto Elementary School
Duff Elementary School

Dunn Elementary School
Ellis Elementary School
Farrell Elementary School
Fitzgerald Elementary School
Foster Elementary School
Goodman Elementary School
Hale Elementary School
Hill Elementary School
Johns Elementary School
Jones Academy of Fine Arts
Key Elementary School
Knox Elementary School
Larson Elementary School
Jason B. Little Elementary School
Miller Elementary School
Mary Moore Elementary School
McNutt Elementary School
Morton Elementary School
Patrick Elementary School
Peach Elementary School
Pearcy Elementary School

Pope Elementary School
Rankin Elementary School
Remynse Elementary School
Roark Elementary School
Sherrod Elementary School
Short Elementary School
South Davis Elementary School
Speer Elementary School
Starrett Elementary School
Swift Elementary School
Thornton Elementary School
Webb Elementary School
West Elementary School
Williams Elementary School
Wimbish Elementary School
Wood Elementary School

Footnotes
1. 1985-86 National Blue Ribbon School.

Kindergarten and Pre-Kindergarten 
Kooken Pre-Kindergarten School

See also 

List of school districts in Texas
List of high schools in Texas

References

External links 
Arlington ISD Homepage
School Directory at aisd.net

 
School districts in Tarrant County, Texas